John J. Caulfield (25 January 1944 – 20 October 2006) was an Australian rules footballer who played with Richmond in the Victorian Football League (VFL) and Port Melbourne in the Victorian Football Association.

A centre half back, Caulfield played nine senior VFL games late in the 1963 season. He joined Port Melbourne in 1965 and would be the VFA club's captain until 1971. He made 118 appearances in total and won Port Melbourne's 'Best and Fairest' in his first season. At the 1966 Hobart Carnival, Caulfield represented the VFA.

See also
 1967 VFA Grand Final

References

1944 births
Richmond Football Club players
Port Melbourne Football Club players
Eltham Football Club players
Australian rules footballers from Victoria (Australia)
2006 deaths